Köln was a Bremen-class frigate of the German Navy.  She was the fifth ship of the class, and the fifth ship to serve with one of the navies of Germany to be named after the city of Cologne, in North Rhine-Westphalia. Her predecessor was the frigate Köln of the Bundesmarine, lead ship of the Köln class.

Construction and commissioning
Köln was laid down in June 1980 at the yards of Blohm+Voss, Hamburg and launched on 29 May 1981. After undergoing trials Köln was commissioned on 19 October 1984. During her later career she was based at Wilhelmshaven as part of 4. Fregattengeschwader, forming a component of Einsatzflottille 2.

Service
After commissioning Köln participated in several international deployments. In early July 1988 Köln deployed with a NATO squadron to search for survivors from the Piper Alpha oil platform in the North Sea, which had been destroyed in a fire. From January to March 1991, Köln was the flagship of the German naval forces deployed in the Mediterranean during the Gulf War. Köln was the flagship of Task Group 500.02 during this period, operating off the Somali coast. The squadron made port visits in Tunisia and several NATO member states. Plans had been made to visit Haifa, transit the Suez Canal and enter the Red Sea, but violence in the region caused these plans to be cancelled. Köln returned to Wilhelmshaven  on 17 December 2000, having sailed 18,734.5 nautical miles.

Köln sailed from Wilhelmshaven  on 2 January 2002 to join the force supporting Operation Enduring Freedom. She spent 6½ months on deployment, before returning to Wilhelmshaven in mid-July. She was again deployed in support of Operation Enduring Freedom, operating off the Horn of Africa and the Arabian Peninsula from April to October 2007, succeeding her sister ship Bremen as part of Combined Task Force 150. On 30 August 2010 Köln joined Operation Atalanta, the EU's anti-piracy mission off the Horn of Africa, replacing the frigate Schleswig-Holstein, and returning to Wilhelmshaven on 10 December 2010. Köln embarked on her final deployment on 29 August 2011, joining Operation Atalanta, and returning to Wilhelmshaven on 9 December 2011.

Köln was removed from active service on 1 February 2012 and in early May that year was towed to the Wilhelmshaven naval base to prepare for decommissioning. She was decommissioned on 31 July 2012. After some time spent laid up, she was put up for sale for scrapping on 24 August 2015. On 10 October 2016 Köln was towed to Kampen, Overijssel, in the Netherlands, to be scrapped.

References

External link

Bremen-class frigates
1981 ships
Ships built in Hamburg